Taquarana is a municipality located in the center of the Brazilian state of Alagoas. Its population was 20,072 (2020) and its area is 166 km2.

References

Municipalities in Alagoas